Adapted live stage tours are theatrical or stadium productions, based on directly or indirectly on licensed properties.

 Bear in the Big Blue House Live, VEE Corporation
 Big Comfy Couch Live
 Blue's Clues Live
 Caillou Live
 Care Bears Live, VEE Corporation
 Clifford, the Big Red Dog
 Dinosaurs Live!, 
 Dragon Tales Live, VEE Corporation
 Jim Henson's Muppet Babies Live!, VEE Corporation
 Max and Ruby Live
 Mighty Morphin Power Rangers World Tour Live on Stage
 Pokémon Live!
 Rugrats: A Live Adventure
 Sesame Street Live, VEE Corporation
 Sesamstrasse
 Zoobilee Zoo Live!

Not included on this list are stationary productions like Playhouse Disney: Live on Stage

Touring theatre